Thurii, called also by some Latin writers Thurium (compare  in Ptolemy), for a time also Copia and Copiae, was a city of Magna Graecia, situated on the Tarentine gulf, within a short distance of the site of Sybaris, whose place it may be considered as having taken. The ruins of the city can be found in the Sybaris archaeological park near Sibari in the Province of Cosenza, Calabria, Italy.

History

Foundation
Thurii was an ancient Greek colony
founded by people from Athens and Sybaris in 443 B.C.
Justin writes that people say that the city of Thurii was built by Philoctetes and his monument is seen there even to his days, as well as the arrows of Hercules which laid up in the temple of Apollo.
The site of that city had remained desolate for a period of 58 years after its destruction by the Crotoniats; when at length, in 452 BC, a number of the Sybarite exiles and their descendants made an attempt to establish themselves again on the spot, under the guidance of some leaders of Thessalian origin; and the new colony rose so rapidly to prosperity that it excited the jealousy of the Crotoniats, who, in consequence, expelled the new settlers a little more than 5 years after the establishment of the colony. The fugitive Sybarites first appealed for support to Sparta, but without success: their application to the Athenians was more successful, and that people determined to send out a fresh colony, at the same time that they reinstated the settlers who had been lately expelled from thence. A body of Athenian colonists was accordingly sent out by Pericles, under the command of Lampon and Xenocritus. Pericles' expressed intent was for it to be a Panhellenic colony, and the number of Athenian citizens was small, the greater part of those who took part in the colony being collected from various parts of Greece. Among them were two celebrated names – Herodotus the historian, and the orator Lysias, both of whom appear to have formed part of the original colony. The laws of the new colony were established by the sophist Protagoras at the request of Pericles, adopting the laws of Zaleucus of Locri.

The new colonists at first established themselves on the site of the deserted Sybaris, but shortly afterwards removed (apparently in obedience to an oracle) to a spot at a short distance from thence, where there was a fountain named "Thuria", from whence the new city derived its name of Thurii. The foundation of Thurii is assigned by Diodorus to the year 446 BC; but other authorities place it three years later, 443 BC, and this seems to be the best authenticated date. The protection of the Athenian name probably secured the rising colony from the assaults of the Crotoniats, at least we hear nothing of any obstacles to its progress from that quarter; but it was early disturbed by dissensions between the descendants of the original Sybarite settlers and the new colonists, the former laying claim not only to honorary distinctions, but to the exclusive possession of important political privileges. These disputes at length ended in a revolution, and the Sybarites were finally expelled from the city. They established themselves for a short time in Sybaris on the Traeis but did not maintain their footing long, being dislodged and finally dispersed by the neighboring barbarians. The Thurians meanwhile concluded a treaty of peace with Crotona, and the new city rose rapidly to prosperity. Fresh colonists poured in from all quarters, especially the Peloponnese; and though it continued to be generally regarded as an Athenian colony, the Athenians in fact formed but a small element of the population. The citizens were divided, as we learn from Diodorus, into ten tribes, the names of which sufficiently indicate their origin. They were: the Arcadian (from Arcadia), Achaean (from Achaea), Elean (from Elea), Boeotian (from Boeotia), Amphictyonic (from Amphictyonis), Dorian (from Doris), Ionian (from Ionia), Athenian (from Athens), Euboean (from Euboea), and Nesiotic (from the islands). The form of government was democratic, and the city is said to have enjoyed the advantage of a well-ordered system of laws; but the statement of Diodorus, who represents this as owing to the legislation of Charondas, and that lawgiver himself as a citizen of Thurii, is certainly erroneous. The city itself was laid out with great regularity, being divided by four broad streets or plateae, each of which was crossed in like manner by three others.

War and conflict
Very shortly after its foundation, Thurii became involved in a war with Tarentum (modern Taranto). The subject of this was the possession of the fertile district of the Siritis, about 50 km north of Thurii, to which the Athenians had a claim of long standing, which was naturally taken up by their colonists. The Spartan general, Cleandridas, who had been banished from Greece some years before, and taken up his abode at Thurii, became the general of the Thurians in this war, which, after various successes, was at length terminated by a compromise, both parties agreeing to the foundation of the new colony of Heracleia in the disputed territory.

Knowledge of the history of Thurii is very scanty and fragmentary. Fresh disputes arising between the Athenian citizens and the other colonists were at length allayed by the oracle of Delphi, which decided that the city had no other founder than Apollo. But the same difference appears again on occasion of the great Athenian expedition to Sicily, when the city was divided into two parties, the one desirous of favoring and supporting the Athenians, the other opposed to them. The latter faction at first prevailed, so far that the Thurians observed the same neutrality towards the Athenian fleet under Nicias and Alcibiades as the other cities of Italy.  Thurii was, in fact, the city where Alcibiades escaped his Athenian captors who were taking him home for trial.

But two years afterwards (413 BC) the Athenian party had regained the ascendency; and when Demosthenes and Eurymedon touched at Thurii, the citizens afforded them every assistance, and even furnished an auxiliary force of 700 hoplites and 300 dartmen. From this time we hear nothing of Thurii for a period of more than 20 years, though there is reason to believe that this was just the time of its greatest prosperity. In 390 BC we find that its territory was already beginning to suffer from the incursions of the Lucanians, a new and formidable enemy, for protection against whom all the cities of Magna Graecia had entered into a defensive league. But the Thurians were too impatient to wait for the support of their allies, and issued forth with an army of 14,000 foot and 1000 horse, with which they repulsed the attacks of the Lucanians; but having rashly followed them into their own territory, they were totally defeated, near Laüs, and above 10,000 of them cut to pieces.

This defeat must have inflicted a severe blow on the prosperity of Thurii, while the continually increasing power of the Lucanians and Bruttians, in their immediate neighborhood would prevent them from quickly recovering from its effects. The city continued also to be on hostile, or at least unfriendly, terms with Dionysius of Syracuse, and was in consequence chosen as a place of retirement or exile by his brother Leptines and his friend Philistus. The rise of the Bruttian people about 356 BC probably became the cause of the complete decline of Thurii, but the statement of Diodorus that the city was conquered by that people must be received with considerable doubt. It reappears in history at a later period, when Corinthian soldiers en route to join Timoleon on his expedition to Syracuse are blockaded there by Carthaginian ships. At this point it is still an independent Greek city, though much fallen from its former greatness. No mention of it is found during the wars of Alexander of Epirus in this part of Italy; but at a later period it was so hard pressed by the Lucanians that it had recourse to the alliance of Rome; and a Roman army was sent to its relief under Gaius Fabricius Luscinus. He defeated the Lucanians, who had actually laid siege to the city, in a pitched battle, and by several other successes to a great extent broke their power, and thus relieved the Thurians from all immediate danger from that quarter. But shortly after they were attacked on the other side by the Tarentines, who are said to have taken and plundered their city; and this aggression was one of the immediate causes of the war declared by the Romans against Tarentum in 282 BC.

Roman dependency
Thurii now sunk completely into the condition of a dependent ally of Rome, and was protected by a Roman garrison. No mention is found of its name during the wars with Pyrrhus or the First Punic War, but it plays a considerable part in the Second Punic War with Hannibal. It was apparently one of the cities which revolted to the Carthaginians after the battle of Cannae. In another passage, Livy places its defection more precisely in 212 BC. After the defection of Tarentum, they betrayed the Roman troops into the hands of the Carthaginian general Hanno. A few years later (210 BC), Hannibal, finding himself unable to protect his allies in Campania, removed the inhabitants of Atella who had survived the fall of their city to Thurii; but it was not long before he was compelled to abandon the latter city also to its fate. When he himself in 204 BC withdrew his forces into Bruttium, he removed to Crotona 3500 of the principal citizens of Thurii, while he gave up the city itself to the plunder of his troops. It is evident that Thurii was now sunk to the lowest state of decay, but the great fertility of its territory rendered it desirable to preserve it from utter desolation. Hence in 194 BC, it was one of the places selected for the establishment of a Roman colony with Latin rights. The number of colonists was small in proportion to the extent of land to be divided among them, but they amounted to 3000 foot and 300 knights. Livy says merely that the colony was sent in Thurinum agrum, and does not mention anything of a change of name, but Strabo tells us that they gave to the new colony the name of Copiae, and this statement is confirmed both by Stephanus of Byzantium and by the evidence of coins, on which, however, the name is written "COPIA". But this new name did not continue long in use, and Thurii still continued to be known by its ancient appellation. It is mentioned as a municipal town on several occasions during the latter ages of the Roman Republic. In 72 BC it was taken by Spartacus and subjected to heavy contributions but not otherwise injured. According to Suetonius, the Octavian family held some renown there, and Gaius Octavius (father of the future Caesar Augustus) defeated a Spartacist army near there. As a result, the future emperor was granted the surname Thurinus shortly after birth. At the outbreak of the Civil Wars, it was deemed by Julius Caesar of sufficient importance to be secured with a garrison of Gaulish and Spanish horse, and it was there that M. Caelius Rufus was put to death, after a vain attempt to excite an insurrection in this part of Italy. In 40 BC also it was attacked by Sextus Pompeius, who laid waste its territory, but he was repulsed from the walls of the city.

It is certain therefore that Thurii was at this time still a place of some importance, and it is mentioned as a still existing town by Pliny and Ptolemy, as well as Strabo. It was probably, indeed, the only place of any consideration remaining on the coast of the Tarentine gulf between Crotona and Tarentum; both Metapontum and Heracleia having already fallen into almost complete decay. Its name is still found in the Itineraries, and it is noticed by Procopius as still existing in the 6th century.

Abandonment 
Over time the sediment accretion of the Crati river caused its river delta to shift towards the sea at a long term rate of one meter a year. As a consequence the successive sites of Sybaris, Thurii, and Copia became landlocked and lost their importance because they no longer had easy access to the sea for trade. The period of its final decay is uncertain; but it seems to have been abandoned during the Middle Ages when the inhabitants took refuge at a place called Terranova (Terranova da Sibari), about 15 kilometers inland, on a hill on the left bank of the Crati.

The exact location of Greek Thurii is not known but that of the Roman town, which probably though not certainly occupied the same site, is fixed by several ruins as being about 6 kilometers to the east of Terranova da Sibari and as occupying an area some 6 km in circuit. It is clear from the statements both of Diodorus and Strabo, that Thurii occupied a site near to, but distinct from, that of Sybaris: hence the position suggested by some local topographers at the foot of the hill of Terranova, is probably too far inland. It is more likely that the true site is to be sought to the north of the Coscile (the ancient Sybaris), a few kilometers from the sea, where ruins still exist, attributed to Sybaris, but which are probably in reality those of Thurii. Henry Swinburne, however, mentions Roman ruins as existing in the peninsula formed by the rivers Crathis and Sybaris near their junction, which may perhaps be those of Thurii.

Coinage
Thurii had an active mint in antiquity. The coins of Thurii are of great beauty; their number and variety indeed gives us a higher idea of the opulence and prosperity of the city than we should gather from the statements of ancient writers.

Famous people
 Alexis (ancient comic poet)
 Herodotus, who migrated to Thurii from Athens after 443 BC.
 Lysias, who migrated to Thurii from Athens c. 430 BC.

See also
List of ancient Greek cities

References

External links

Colonies of Magna Graecia
Athenian colonies
Roman sites of Calabria
Former populated places in Italy
Province of Cosenza
Archaeological sites in Calabria
Socii
Spartan colonies